Read NZ Te Pou Muramura (formerly the New Zealand Book Council) is a not-for-profit organisation that presents a wide range of programmes to promote books and reading in New Zealand.

History 
It was established in 1972 as a response to UNESCO's International Book Year.

In 2019, the New Zealand Book Council changed its name to Read NZ Te Pou Muramura.

Organisation 
Read NZ Te Pou Muramural is based in Wellington.

Secretary/Chief executives 
 Fiona Kidman (1972- )
 Kate Fortune
 Jean Needham 
 Philippa Christmas 
 Karen Ross (2006–26 April 2007)
 Noel Murphy (28 May 2007–October 2012)
 Catriona Ferguson (2012–2016)
 Kathryn Carmody (acting) 
 Dr Jo Cribb (8 May 2017 – 20 December 2019)
 Juliet Blyth (February 2020–)

Programmes 
It runs a public events programme that takes New Zealand and international writers to venues around the country. Programmes include:

 Writers in Schools which takes New Zealand writers and illustrators into schools throughout the country.

New Zealand writers database 
Read NZ Te Pou Muramura produces a comprehensive online database of New Zealand writers.

References

External links
Read NZ Te Pou Muramura website
Writers in Schools programme

Non-profit organisations based in New Zealand
Literary magazines published in New Zealand